Leptinaria strebeliana is a species of small tropical air-breathing land snails, terrestrial pulmonate gastropod mollusks in the family Achatinidae.

Distribution 
This species is endemic to Nicaragua.

References

Subulininae
Gastropods described in 1907
Taxonomy articles created by Polbot